Harry Woodgate Greenhalgh (27 June 1900 – 1982) was an English footballer who played as a right back in The Football League with Bolton Wanderers in the 1920s. He was a member of the Bolton Wanderers team which won the 1926 FA Cup Final.

References

1900 births
Footballers from Bolton
1982 deaths
Association football defenders
Bolton Wanderers F.C. players
English Football League players
Atherton F.C. players
English footballers
FA Cup Final players